Mazraat Yachouh, also spelled Mazraat Yachouaa, is a municipality in the Matn District of the Mount Lebanon Governorate of Lebanon, situated approximately 16km east of Beirut. In 2006, the municipality had two public schools and one private school, with an enrollment of 299 and 218 students, respectively.

Etymology 
The exact origin of the village name Mazraat Yachouh is unknown, but the name is Arabic for "Jacob Farm."

Demographics and Government 
2010 government data indicated the city had a resident population of 1,453 registered voters. The Mazraat Yachouh city council contains nine elected councilmen (Arabic: موظفو مجلس المدينة), with two members of the selected workforce (Arabic: القوى العاملة المختارة).

Geography 
It is situated in central Lebanon, east of Beirut, west of the town of Bikfaya, and south west of Mount Sannine.

Religion 
Consistent with the majority of the Matn District, the vast majority of inhabitants of Mazraat Yachouh are Christians, with Maronite, Greek Orthodox, and other Christian minorities.

References 

Populated places in the Matn District
Tourist attractions in Lebanon
Eastern Orthodox Christian communities in Lebanon
Melkite Christian communities in Lebanon